Linlithgow was a county constituency of the House of Commons of the Parliament of the United Kingdom from 1983 to 2005. It elected one Member of Parliament (MP) by the first past the post system of elections.

The constituency returned the same MP throughout its existence, Tam Dalyell of the Labour Party. Dalyell had previously been MP for the predecessor seat of West Lothian, which had led to his concerns about Scottish devolution being labelled "the West Lothian question".

History 
The constituency was created for the 1983 general election, largely replacing the previous West Lothian constituency. For the 2005 general election, Linlithgow was largely replaced by the new Linlithgow and East Falkirk constituency, with the remainder of the constituency joining Livingston.

The Scottish Parliament constituency of Linlithgow was created in 1999 with the same boundaries as the UK Parliament constituency.

Boundaries 
1983–1997: The West Lothian District electoral divisions of Bathgate East/Blackburn, Bathgate West/Armadale, Linlithgow, and Whitburn, and the City of Edinburgh District ward of Queensferry.

1997–2005: The West Lothian District electoral divisions of Bathgate East/Blackburn, Bathgate West/Armadale, Linlithgow/Winchburgh, and Whitburn.

Members of Parliament

Election results

Elections of the 1980s

Elections of the 1990s

Elections of the 2000s

References 

Politics of West Lothian
Historic parliamentary constituencies in Scotland (Westminster)
Constituencies of the Parliament of the United Kingdom established in 1983
Constituencies of the Parliament of the United Kingdom disestablished in 2005
Linlithgow